Gomuşçu is a village in the municipality of Təzəkənd in the Salyan Rayon of Azerbaijan.

References

Populated places in Salyan District (Azerbaijan)